Horné Lefantovce is a village and municipality in the Nitra District of the Nitra Region, in western Slovakia.

History
In historical records the village was first mentioned in 1113. It was the ancestral estate of the medieval Elefánthy family, who built a 13th-century castle and a 14th-century monastery in the village.

Geography
The village lies in the centre of a west facing valley, at an altitude of around 190 metres and covers an area of 18.603 km². A small stream runs through the village, and drains into the Nitra River.

Facilities
The village has a public library a gym and football pitch.

See also
 List of municipalities and towns in Slovakia

References

Genealogical resources

The records for genealogical research are available at the state archive "Statny Archiv in Nitra, Slovakia"

 Roman Catholic church records (births/marriages/deaths): 1720-1940 (parish A)

External links
 Village website
Horné Lefantovce on Zoznam Map
Surnames of living people in Horne Lefantovce

Villages and municipalities in Nitra District